A. Durairasu was an Indian politician and former Member of Parliament elected from Tamil Nadu. He was elected to the Lok Sabha from Perambalur constituency as a Dravida Munnetra Kazhagam candidate in 1967 and 1971 elections.

References 

Dravida Munnetra Kazhagam politicians
Living people
India MPs 1967–1970
India MPs 1971–1977
Lok Sabha members from Tamil Nadu
People from Perambalur district
Year of birth missing (living people)